The men's tandem was a cycling event at the 1968 Summer Olympics in Mexico City, Mexico, held on 20 to 21 October 1968. There were 28 participants from 14 nations.

Competition format

This tandem bicycle competition involved a series of head-to-head matches. The 1968 competition involved six rounds: four main rounds (first round, quarterfinals, semifinals, and finals) as well as a two-round repechage after the first round.

 First round: The 14 teams were divided into 7 heats of 2 cyclists each. The winner of each heat advanced directly to the quarterfinal (7 teams); the loser went to the repechage (7 teams).
 Repechage: This was a two-round repechage. The repechage began with 3 heats of 2 or 3 teams each. The top team in each heat advanced to the second round, while the other team or teams in each heat were eliminated. The second round of this repechage featured a single heats of 3 teams, with the winner advancing to the quarterfinals and the losers eliminated.
 Quarterfinals: Beginning with the quarterfinals, all matches were one-on-one competitions and were held in best-of-three format. There were 4 quarterfinals, with the winner of each advancing to the semifinals and the loser eliminated.
 Semifinals: The two semifinals provided for advancement to the gold medal final for winners and to the bronze medal final for losers.
 Finals: Both a gold medal final and a bronze medal final were held.

Results

First round

First round heat 1

First round heat 2

First round heat 3

First round heat 4

First round heat 5

First round heat 6

First round heat 7

Repechage heats

Repechage heat 1

Repechage heat 2

Repechage heat 3

Repechage final

Quarterfinals

Quarterfinal 1

Quarterfinal 2

Quarterfinal 3

Quarterfinal 4

Semifinals

Semifinal 1

Semifinal 2

Finals

Bronze medal match

Final

Final classification

References

Cycling at the 1968 Summer Olympics
Cycling at the Summer Olympics – Men's tandem
Track cycling at the 1968 Summer Olympics